Pakistan Football Federation (PFF) is the governing body of association football in Pakistan. Founded in 1947, its headquarters are at the FIFA Football House in Lahore, Punjab near Punjab Stadium. The federation manages the men's and women's national teams. The PFF is a member of AFC and FIFA.

History

Early years 
Upon Pakistan's independence in 1947, both East and West wings of the country inherited the football infrastructure of the British Raj. The need for establishing a nationwide football association to govern the game properly was urgent, since India had inherited the erstwhile Calcutta-based Indian Football Association and the All-India Football Federation (AIFF).

Thus, on 5 December 1947 the Pakistan Football Federation was created. Mohammad Ali Jinnah, Pakistan's first Governor-General, became the patron-in-chief, and in 1948, the PFF became affiliated with FIFA. It was also one of the founding members of the Asian Football Confederation in 1954.

PFF organized the first National Football Championship from 28 May to 5 June 1948 in Karachi, with Sindh Red beating Sindh Blue in the final.

Previously, corrupt and inefficient management, poor support from the authorities to the players and to the game itself, poor media coverage and the status of cricket as the most popular game in the country were some of the factors as to why football remained underdeveloped since independence. Also due to politics within the organisation, there was a time when FIFA had suspended Pakistan from all international football due to rival PFF factions setting up their own teams to take part in international and national competitions. Such things hindered any chance of football's progress over the last two decades.

Hayat's reign 
However, in August 2003, the PFF was under new management, as Makhdoom Syed Faisal Saleh Hayat took over, and he has turned around the fortunes of Pakistani football. With the Assistance of FIFA, the PFF set up a national football league in 2004, which is now called the Pakistan Premier League. In 2005 a national championship was set up for women's football. In 2007, the inter-city Geo Super Football League was established, making it the first time that Pakistani club football was telecast live on national television via GEO Super. It also became Pakistan's first professional football tournament.

Since 2015 and the controversial third election of Makhdoom Syed Faisal Saleh Hayat, the PFF has been going through an internal feud that unables the local and national teams to partake to any international event. In July 2017, the FIFA threatened to suspend the PFF's membership if it kept refusing to hand football affairs to its president-elect Faisal Saleh Hayat. Former coach Nasir Ismail asked FIFA to hold fresh elections for the PFF's presidency.

On 11 October 2017 the FIFA decided to suspend Pakistan Football Federation (PFF) with immediate effect  On 13 March 2018 FIFA lifted the suspension

Overview
At both club and international football, Pakistan have seen results improve. Pakistani rise has attracted many abroad origin players throughout the world. However, more effort and sincerity by the officials is required to allow further progress of the sport in Pakistan. Current bureaucratic inefficiencies and lackluster politics remain within the PFF machinery that have always hindered the true growth of the game in Pakistan at a faster rate.

Pakistan's core national league has three divisions. The National Football Championship (A-Division) is named as the Pakistan Premier League (PPL), while National Championship (B-Division) is known as the Pakistan Football Federation League (PFF League). National Club Championship (C-Division) used to be the lowest division. Below this are regional leagues. There is also a national knock-out competition called the National Football Challenge Cup although it appears to be used sparingly nowadays, as PFF is one of the most corrupt organizations, per UNESCO corruption rankings.

Criticism
Over the past several years, the Pakistan Football Federation has been accused of several corruption scandals and incompetence in running the day-to-day footballing activities in Pakistan. Local media outlets have described the current situation of the PFF as a "horror show".

Faisal Saleh Hayat incompetence
Hayat was the President of the Pakistan Football Federation and also serves as a member of the Strategic Committee of FIFA. He has held this position since 2003, and has been described as a "lord of Pakistani football". During his controversial tenure, Pakistan's FIFA ranking has dropped from 168 in 2003 to 201 in 2017. Despite his lackluster results, Hayat continues to hold on to his position as president. Hayat himself in also the middle of various corruption allegations involving PFF and a legal battle at Lahore High Court with a warring faction intent on seeing him removed from office. The top division of the Pakistan Premier League remains suspended because the crisis created due to his actions. The men's senior team last played in March 2015, when they bowed out of the 2018 FIFA World Cup qualifiers in the first round.

In June 2017, 18 of the 26 members of the PFF voted in favor of Faisal Saleh Hayat's dismissal for incompetence and embezzlement of PFF funds. In July 2017, the FIFA threatened to suspend the PFF's membership if it kept refusing to hand football affairs to its president-elect Faisal Saleh Hayat.

Punjab Football Association elections controversy
In June 2015, the PFF presidential elections were announced, with Faisal Saleh Hayat facing his biggest challenge since 2003. Several senior members of the PFF as well as the government were intent on having Hayat removed from power. Controversy began at the Punjab Football Association, when the Hayat-backed Sardar Naveed Haider Khan toppled incumbent Arshad Khan Lodhi. Several of Lodhi's voters were banned by Hayat's illegal disciplinary committee. With this, Zahir Ali Shah a PFF vice-president, turned against Hayat and announced his intention to run for PFF presidency. Shortly after his announcement, allegations emerged from Shah claiming that Hayat had changed several clauses of the PFF constitution to suit himself in the presidential election. The PFF eventually split into two groups following an Extraordinary Congress meeting that suspended Hayat. With the election approaching, the two factions announced their own election venues. The Lahore High Court was forced to intervene in and ordered a stay on polling and appointed a temporary administrator until matters were resolved between the two factions.

The row intensified when the Hayat faction went on and held election anyway, disobeying the Lahore High Court stay order. FIFA then intervened and sent a fact-finding mission. They concluded that Hayat be given a mandate for two years, in which he would have to amend PFF statutes and form an independent disciplinary committee before holding elections again.

The Lahore High Court appointed administrator Asad Munir was given authority to manage football activity in Pakistan, while the two factions sorted out differences. In a shocking move, the Hayat faction swiftly withdrew the Pakistan team from the 2015 SAFF Cup, only causing more resentment from football fans and senior PFF members who were intent on seeing Hayat removed from office. Many suggest that Faisal Saleh Hayat is not mentally stable.

In October 2016, the FIFA executive committee indicated all is not well with the Faisal Saleh Hayat faction of the PFF. A FIFA spokesperson said "given the current situation, FIFA has been withholding development funding to PFF."

In February 2017, the Lahore High Court restored Faisal Saleh Hayat as president of the Pakistan Football Federation. The FIFA Executive Committee decided that the current PFF leadership – led by Faisal Saleh Hayat – would be given two years (until September 2017) to revise the PFF statutes and organise elections accordingly.

Crisis

2015 crisis
Just before PPF elections in 2015, two groups were formed within the federation and there infighting in the federation due to which FIFA took notice and told the federation to solve the matters, being in contact with AFC.
Lahore High Court (LHC) declared PFF elections to be held on 30 June 2015.
On 30 June, the elections were declared null/void by LHC, attended by AFC observer, Sanjeevan Balasinggam. The PFF chairman Faisal Saleh Hayat said that the "Elections were approved by AFC, but the Asian governing body had no comment on the situation."

Due to crisis Pakistan has not qualified for any of the international tournament since March 2015 and FIFA rankings have slumped to 198 for men's team.

A normalization committee was made for the Pakistan Football Federation (PFF) whose task is to hold elections of the country's football governing body and bring it would bring an end to a four-year crisis that resulted in Pakistan suffering significantly in the game.

2021 crisis

On 27 March 2021, the PFF's office was attacked and people inside held hostage by its former president, Syed Ashfaq Hussain Shah, and his group, and the ongoing women's championship was cancelled. Major clubs protested: Diya W.F.C. announced that "laws were laid down by FIFA, PFF NC and the AFC", Mohsin Gillani W.F.C. announced it pulled out and Karachi United condemned actions taken against the NC, stating to be "fully and respectfully supportive of following due process as per FIFA directives."

Suspensions
FIFA has given warnings and suspension for PFA on several occasions. FIFA had issued a warning to suspend Pakistan if the third party interference (i.e. involvement of Lahore High Court) is not ended as soon as possible.

On 10 October 2017, FIFA suspended PFF with immediate effect. FIFA stated on its website:

meaning Pakistan will not be a part of any footballing activity officially until further notice is provided by the governing body.

In 2018, the ban was lifted by FIFA and Pakistan has been given the opportunity to participate in the 2018 Asian Games and the 2018 SAFF competitions.

On 7 April 2021, FIFA suspended the federation with immediate effect due to third-party interference, which constitutes a serious violation of the FIFA statutes.

On 1 July 2022, FIFA lifted the ban on Pakistan Football Federation.

Competitions for men
The PFF currently runs several competitions:
 Pakistan Premier League – Current
 PFF League (2nd division) – Current
 PFF National Challenge Cup – Current
 Geo Super Football League – defunct
 KASB Premier League – defunct

Football leagues

The Pakistan Premier League (PPL) & the Pakistan Football Federation League (PFFL) are competed between various clubs and department teams. Clubs are relegated from the PPL based on ranking and clubs are also promoted to the PPL from the PFFL based on rankings as well.

Tier 1: Pakistan Premier League
The Pakistan Premier League (PPL) is a Pakistani semi-professional league for men's association football departments and clubs which in the Pakistan football league system, is the country's top tier semi-professional football league. Contested by departments and clubs, it operates on a system of promotion and relegation with the PFF League.
Tier 2: Pakistan Football Federation League
The Pakistan Football Federation League (PFFL) is a Pakistani semi-professional league for men's association football departments and clubs which, in the Pakistan football league system, is the country's second tier semi-professional football competition. Contested by  departments and clubs as well, it operates on a system of promotion and relegation with the Pakistan Premier League. Each season, the two top-finishing teams from club-phase and departmental-phase in the Federation League are automatically promoted to the Pakistan Premier League and the winner of the final between club-phase and departmental-phase is crowned as the Federation League champion.
Knock-Out Cup: PFF National Challenge Cup
The PFF National Challenge Cup is an annual semi-professional knockout football competition in men's domestic Pakistani football within the Pakistan football league system.

Competitions for women

 National Women Football Championship
 National Women Inter Club Football Championship

Board of directors

See also
Football in Pakistan
Pakistan national football team
List of football clubs in Pakistan

References

External links
Pakistan at AFC site
Pakistan at FIFA site
Dawn, A history of football in Pakistan — Part I
Dawn, A history of football in Pakistan — Part II

Federation
Sports governing bodies in Pakistan
1947 establishments in Pakistan
Pakistan
Sports organizations established in 1947
Football governing bodies in Pakistan